Dietrich ("Didi") Thurau (born 9 November 1954 in Frankfurt) is a retired German professional road bicycle racer.  His biggest career achievements include winning the one-day classic, Liège–Bastogne–Liège, his home country's Deutschland Tour and surprising the field at the 1977 Tour de France by capturing four stages and holding the yellow jersey as leader of the general classification from the prologue for 15 days. Thurau did win the young rider classification although he lost the overall lead to eventual winner Bernard Thévenet.

Thurau was German pursuit champion three times and won 29 six-day races. He is the father of former professional cyclist Björn Thurau. In 1989, he revealed he had doped throughout his career.

Career 
He won the German National Road Race in 1975 and 1976. After his victory in the points classification in the Vuelta a España and a fourth place in the general classification in the Vuelta a España in 1976, Thurau was seen as a talented rider, but not seen as a rider for the general classification. This changed when he won the prologue 1977 Tour de France, won time trials and mountain stages, keeping the lead until far in the race, finishing fifth in the overall classification and won the young rider classification.

Thurau signed a contract to ride the 1978 season as a team leader at IJsboerke. Before his contract started, but after he signed it, he rode the 1977 UCI Road World Championships. Seven kilometers before the finish, he was away together with Francesco Moser, and Moser punctured. To the surprise of commentators, including the coach of the French team Jacques Anquetil and Thurau's team leader Peter Post, Thurau waited for Moser, and was beaten in the sprint by Moser. This caused rumours that Thurau had sold the championship to Moser; it later became clear that Thurau's new bosses at IJsboerke did not want Thurau to ride in the rainbow jersey, but wanted him to keep his sponsored jersey.

Thurau's primary goals for the next season became the 1978 Giro d'Italia and the 1978 UCI Road World Championships, and his team skipped the 1978 Tour de France, because they felt there were too many mountain finishes for a rider like Thurau. Although Thurau won two stages in the 1978 Giro, it did not go as expected, as he had to abandon the race in the tenth stage, when he had already given up all hopes for the general classification.

In 1979, Thurau won Liège–Bastogne–Liège, and again came second in the 1979 UCI Road World Championships, but he was no longer seen as able to win a grand tour, and he changed teams. He continued as a professional cyclist for several years, but did not win any major races.

Doping 
Thurau tested positive for stimulants after Stage 8 of the 1987 Tour de France. He was fined 5,000 FF (£500), incurred a 10-minute time penalty, placed last on the stage and was given a one-month suspended ban. However, by the time the positive result was revealed, Thurau had already abandoned the Tour.

After he had retired, in 1989, he gave an interview to the Bild newspaper, in Germany, where he revealed he had doped throughout his career, including the use of Amphetamines, Testosterone and Cortisone.

Personal life 
In 1998, Thurau was fined 20,000 DM for forgery. In 2012, it was reported that he had embezzled 49,000 EUR in insurance benefits, which were meant for his father, Helmut, to pay for his nursing home. Instead, Thurau kept the money. He was convicted of the offence and was fined 39,900 EUR.

His son Björn Thurau is also a racing cyclist, banned for doping, whilst Björn's younger brother Urs is a tennis player who is coached by Dietrich.

Major results

1975
 1st Tour de Picardie
 1st Grand Prix de Fourmies
1976
 1st  Road race, National Road Championships
 4th Overall Vuelta a España
1st  Points classification
1st Prologue, Stages 9, 16, 18 & 19b (ITT)
1977
 1st E3 Prijs Vlaanderen
 5th Overall Tour de France
1st  Young rider classification
1st Prologue, Stages 2, 5b, 16 & 22a
1978
 1st  Overall Étoile de Bessèges
 1st Züri–Metzgete
 Giro d'Italia
1st Prologue & Stage 4
 3rd Overall Tour of Belgium
1979
 1st  Overall Deutschland Tour
1st Prologue
 1st Liège–Bastogne–Liège
 1st Stage 19 Tour de France
 1st Six Days of Munich (with Patrick Sercu)
1984
 1st Six Days of Bremen (with Albert Fritz)
1986
 1st Six Days of Bremen (with Josef Kristen)
 1st Six Days of Munich (with Danny Clark)
1987
 1st Six Days of Bremen (with Danny Clark)
 1st Six Days of Munich (with Urs Freuler)

See also
 List of doping cases in cycling

References

External links

Official Tour de France results for Dietrich Thurau

1954 births
Living people
Cyclists from Frankfurt
German male cyclists
German track cyclists
German cycling road race champions
Tour de France prologue winners
Doping cases in cycling
German sportspeople in doping cases
Tour de Suisse stage winners
German Vuelta a España stage winners